The 70th Assembly District of Wisconsin is one of 99 districts in the Wisconsin State Assembly.  Located in central Wisconsin, the district comprises the northern half of Monroe County, including the cities of Tomah and Sparta, as well as most of Wood County, the eastern half of Jackson County, the northwest corner of Portage County, and parts of northeast La Crosse County.  The district contains much of the land of the Fort McCoy U.S. Army installation. The district is represented by Republican Nancy VanderMeer, since January 2015.

The 70th Assembly district is located within Wisconsin's 24th Senate district, along with the 71st and 72nd Assembly districts.

List of past representatives

References 

Wisconsin State Assembly districts
Jackson County, Wisconsin
Monroe County, Wisconsin
Portage County, Wisconsin
Wood County, Wisconsin